In mathematics, the discrete Fourier transform (DFT) converts a finite sequence of equally-spaced samples of a function into a same-length sequence of equally-spaced samples of the discrete-time Fourier transform (DTFT), which is a complex-valued function of frequency. The interval at which the DTFT is sampled is the reciprocal of the duration of the input sequence.  An inverse DFT (IDFT) is a Fourier series, using the DTFT samples as coefficients of complex sinusoids at the corresponding DTFT frequencies.  It has the same sample-values as the original input sequence.  The DFT is therefore said to be a frequency domain representation of the original input sequence.  If the original sequence spans all the non-zero values of a function, its DTFT is continuous (and periodic), and the DFT provides discrete samples of one cycle.  If the original sequence is one cycle of a periodic function, the DFT provides all the non-zero values of one DTFT cycle.

The DFT is the most important discrete transform, used to perform Fourier analysis in many practical applications. In digital signal processing, the function is any quantity or signal that varies over time, such as the pressure of a sound wave, a radio signal, or daily temperature readings, sampled over a finite time interval (often defined by a window function). In image processing, the samples can be the values of pixels along a row or column of a raster image. The DFT is also used to efficiently solve partial differential equations, and to perform other operations such as convolutions or multiplying large integers.

Since it deals with a finite amount of data, it can be implemented in computers by numerical algorithms or even dedicated hardware. These implementations usually employ efficient fast Fourier transform (FFT) algorithms; so much so that the terms "FFT" and "DFT" are often used interchangeably.  Prior to its current usage, the "FFT" initialism may have also been used for the ambiguous term "finite Fourier transform".

Definition
The discrete Fourier transform transforms a sequence of N complex numbers  into another sequence of complex numbers,   which is defined by

The DFT has many applications, including purely mathematical ones with no physical interpretation.  But physically it can be related to signal processing as a discrete version (i.e. samples) of the discrete-time Fourier transform (DTFT), which is a continuous and periodic function. The DFT computes N equally-spaced samples of one cycle of the DTFT.  (see Fig.2 and )

Motivation
 can also be evaluated outside the domain , and that extended sequence is -periodic.

 can be interpreted or derived in various ways, for example:

The normalization factor multiplying the DFT and IDFT (here 1 and ) and the signs of the exponents are merely conventions, and differ in some treatments. The only requirements of these conventions are that the DFT and IDFT have opposite-sign exponents and that the product of their normalization factors be .

Example

This example demonstrates how to apply the DFT to a sequence of length  and the input vector

Calculating the DFT of  using 

results in

Inverse transform
The discrete Fourier transform is an invertible, linear transformation

with  denoting the set of complex numbers. Its inverse is known as Inverse Discrete Fourier Transform (IDFT). In other words, for any , an N-dimensional complex vector has a DFT and an IDFT which are in turn -dimensional complex vectors.

The inverse transform is given by:

Properties

Linearity

Time and frequency reversal
Reversing the time (i.e. replacing  by ) in  corresponds to reversing the frequency (i.e.  by ). Mathematically, if  represents the vector x then

if 
then

Conjugation in time
If  then .

Real and imaginary part

Orthogonality 
The vectors  form an orthogonal basis over the set of N-dimensional complex vectors:

where  is the Kronecker delta. This orthogonality condition can be used to derive the formula for the IDFT from the definition of the DFT, and is equivalent to the unitarity property below.

The Plancherel theorem and Parseval's theorem 

where the star denotes complex conjugation.  Plancherel theorem is a special case of the Parseval's theorem and states:

These theorems are also equivalent to the unitary condition below.

Periodicity
The periodicity can be shown directly from the definition:

 

Similarly, it can be shown that the IDFT formula leads to a periodic extension.

Shift theorem
Similarly, a circular shift of the input  corresponds to multiplying the output  by a linear phase. Mathematically, if  represents the vector x then

if 
then 
and

Circular convolution theorem and cross-correlation theorem

The convolution theorem for the discrete-time Fourier transform (DTFT) indicates that a convolution of two sequences can be obtained as the inverse transform of the product of the individual transforms. An important simplification occurs when one of sequences is N-periodic, denoted here by  because  is non-zero at only discrete frequencies (see ), and therefore so is its product with the continuous function   That leads to a considerable simplification of the inverse transform.

where  is a periodic summation of the  sequence: 

Customarily, the DFT and inverse DFT summations are taken over the domain .

Then the convolution can be written as:

(see Circular convolution, Fast convolution algorithms, and Overlap-save)

It has been shown  that any linear transform that turns convolution into pointwise product is the DFT (up to a permutation of coefficients).

Convolution theorem duality 

It can also be shown that:

Trigonometric interpolation polynomial
The trigonometric interpolation polynomial

For even N, notice that the Nyquist component  is handled specially.

This interpolation is not unique: aliasing implies that one could add N to any of the complex-sinusoid frequencies (e.g. changing  to ) without changing the interpolation property, but giving different values in between the  points. The choice above, however, is typical because it has two useful properties. First, it consists of sinusoids whose frequencies have the smallest possible magnitudes: the interpolation is bandlimited.

This interpolation does not minimize the slope, and is not generally real-valued for real ; its use is a common mistake.

The unitary DFT 
Another way of looking at the DFT is to note that in the above discussion, the DFT can be expressed as the DFT matrix, a Vandermonde matrix, 
introduced by Sylvester in 1867,

where  is a primitive Nth root of unity.

The inverse transform is then given by the inverse of the above matrix,

With unitary normalization constants , the DFT becomes a unitary transformation, defined by a unitary matrix:

where  is the determinant function. In a real vector space, a unitary transformation can be thought of as simply a rigid rotation of the coordinate system, and all of the properties of a rigid rotation can be found in the unitary DFT.

The orthogonality of the DFT is now expressed as an orthonormality condition (which arises in many areas of mathematics as described in root of unity):

If X  is defined as the unitary DFT of the vector x, then

and the Parseval's theorem is expressed as

If we view the DFT as just a coordinate transformation which simply specifies the components of a vector in a new coordinate system, then the above is just the statement that the dot product of two vectors is preserved under a unitary DFT transformation. For the special case , this implies that the length of a vector is preserved as well — this is just Plancherel theorem,

A consequence of the circular convolution theorem is that the DFT matrix  diagonalizes any circulant matrix.

Expressing the inverse DFT in terms of the DFT 
A useful property of the DFT is that the inverse DFT can be easily expressed in terms of the (forward) DFT, via several well-known "tricks".  (For example, in computations, it is often convenient to only implement a fast Fourier transform corresponding to one transform direction and then to get the other transform direction from the first.)

First, we can compute the inverse DFT by reversing all but one of the inputs (Duhamel et al., 1988):

Second, one can also conjugate the inputs and outputs:

Third, a variant of this conjugation trick, which is sometimes preferable because it requires no modification of the data values, involves swapping real and imaginary parts (which can be done on a computer simply by modifying pointers). Equivalently,  equals . Then

That is, the inverse transform is the same as the forward transform with the real and imaginary parts swapped for both input and output, up to a normalization (Duhamel et al., 1988).

The conjugation trick can also be used to define a new transform, closely related to the DFT, that is involutory—that is, which is its own inverse. In particular,  is clearly its own inverse: .

Eigenvalues and eigenvectors 

The eigenvalues of the DFT matrix are simple and well-known, whereas the eigenvectors are complicated, not unique, and are the subject of ongoing research.

Consider the unitary form  defined above for the DFT of length N, where

This matrix satisfies the matrix polynomial equation:

This can be seen from the inverse properties above: operating  twice gives the original data in reverse order, so operating  four times gives back the original data and is thus the identity matrix.  This means that the eigenvalues  satisfy the equation:

Since there are only four distinct eigenvalues for this  matrix, they have some multiplicity.  The multiplicity gives the number of linearly independent eigenvectors corresponding to each eigenvalue.  (There are N independent eigenvectors; a unitary matrix is never defective.)

The problem of their multiplicity was solved by McClellan and Parks (1972), although it was later shown to have been equivalent to a problem solved by Gauss (Dickinson and Steiglitz, 1982).  The multiplicity depends on the value of N modulo 4, and is given by the following table:

No simple analytical formula for general eigenvectors is known.   Moreover, the eigenvectors are not unique because any linear combination of eigenvectors for the same eigenvalue is also an eigenvector for that eigenvalue.  Various researchers have proposed different choices of eigenvectors, selected to satisfy useful properties like orthogonality and to have "simple" forms (e.g., McClellan and Parks, 1972; Dickinson and Steiglitz, 1982; Grünbaum, 1982; Atakishiyev and Wolf, 1997; Candan et al., 2000; Hanna et al., 2004; Gurevich and Hadani, 2008).

A straightforward approach is to discretize an eigenfunction of the continuous Fourier transform,
of which the most famous is the Gaussian function.
Since periodic summation of the function means discretizing its frequency spectrum
and discretization means periodic summation of the spectrum,
the discretized and periodically summed Gaussian function yields an eigenvector of the discrete transform:

The closed form expression for the series can be expressed by Jacobi theta functions as

Two other simple closed-form analytical eigenvectors for special DFT period N were found (Kong, 2008):

For DFT period N = 2L + 1 = 4K + 1, where K is an integer, the following is an eigenvector of DFT:

For DFT period N = 2L = 4K, where K is an integer, the following is an eigenvector of DFT:

The choice of eigenvectors of the DFT matrix has become important in recent years in order to define a discrete analogue of the fractional Fourier transform—the DFT matrix can be taken to fractional powers by exponentiating the eigenvalues (e.g., Rubio and Santhanam, 2005).  For the continuous Fourier transform, the natural orthogonal eigenfunctions are the Hermite functions, so various discrete analogues of these have been employed as the eigenvectors of the DFT, such as the Kravchuk polynomials (Atakishiyev and Wolf, 1997).  The "best" choice of eigenvectors to define a fractional discrete Fourier transform remains an open question, however.

Uncertainty principles

Probabilistic uncertainty principle 
If the random variable  is constrained by

then 
 

Although the variances may be analogously defined for the DFT, an analogous uncertainty principle is not useful, because the uncertainty will not be shift-invariant. Still, a meaningful uncertainty principle has been introduced by Massar and Spindel.

However, the Hirschman entropic uncertainty will have a useful analog for the case of the DFT. The Hirschman uncertainty principle is expressed in terms of the Shannon entropy of the two probability functions.

In the discrete case, the Shannon entropies are defined as

and

and the entropic uncertainty principle becomes

The probability mass function  will then be proportional to a suitably translated Kronecker comb of period .

Deterministic uncertainty principle 
There is also a well-known deterministic uncertainty principle that uses signal sparsity (or the number of non-zero coefficients). Then, 

As an immediate consequence of the inequality of arithmetic and geometric means, one also has . Both uncertainty principles were shown to be tight for specifically-chosen "picket-fence" sequences (discrete impulse trains), and find practical use for signal recovery applications.

DFT of real and purely imaginary signals 
If  are real numbers, as they often are in practical applications, then the DFT  is even symmetric:
, where  denotes complex conjugation.

If  are purely imaginary numbers, then the DFT  is odd symmetric:
, where  denotes complex conjugation.

Generalized DFT (shifted and non-linear phase)
It is possible to shift the transform sampling in time and/or frequency domain by some real shifts a and b, respectively. This is sometimes known as a generalized DFT (or GDFT), also called the shifted DFT or offset DFT, and has analogous properties to the ordinary DFT:

Such shifted transforms are most often used for symmetric data, to represent different boundary symmetries, and for real-symmetric data they correspond to different forms of the discrete cosine and sine transforms.

The centered DFT has the useful property that, when N is a multiple of four, all four of its eigenvalues (see above) have equal multiplicities (Rubio and Santhanam, 2005)

The term GDFT is also used for the non-linear phase extensions of DFT. Hence, GDFT method provides a generalization for constant amplitude orthogonal block transforms including linear and non-linear phase types. GDFT is a framework 
to improve time and frequency domain properties of the traditional DFT, e.g. auto/cross-correlations, by the addition of the properly designed phase shaping function (non-linear, in general) to the original linear phase functions (Akansu and Agirman-Tosun, 2010).

The discrete Fourier transform can be viewed as a special case of the z-transform, evaluated on the unit circle in the complex plane; more general z-transforms correspond to complex shifts a and b above.

Multidimensional DFT
The ordinary DFT transforms a one-dimensional sequence or array  that is a function of exactly one discrete variable n.

The inverse of the multi-dimensional DFT is, analogous to the one-dimensional case, given by:

As the one-dimensional DFT expresses the input  as a superposition of sinusoids, the multidimensional DFT expresses the input as a superposition of plane waves, or multidimensional sinusoids. This decomposition is of great importance for everything from digital image processing (two-dimensional) to solving partial differential equations. The solution is broken up into plane waves.

The multidimensional DFT can be computed by the composition of a sequence of one-dimensional DFTs along each dimension.  In the two-dimensional case  the  independent DFTs of the rows (i.e., along ) are computed first to form a new array . Then the  independent DFTs of y along the columns (along ) are computed to form the final result .  Alternatively the columns can be computed first and then the rows. The order is immaterial because the nested summations above commute.

An algorithm to compute a one-dimensional DFT is thus sufficient to efficiently compute a multidimensional DFT.  This approach is known as the row-column algorithm. There are also intrinsically multidimensional FFT algorithms.

The real-input multidimensional DFT 
For input data  consisting of real numbers, the DFT outputs have a conjugate symmetry similar to the one-dimensional case above:

where the star again denotes complex conjugation and the -th subscript is again interpreted modulo  (for ).

Applications 
The DFT has seen wide usage across a large number of fields; we only sketch a few examples below (see also the references at the end). All applications of the DFT depend crucially on the availability of a fast algorithm to compute discrete Fourier transforms and their inverses, a fast Fourier transform.

Spectral analysis 

When the DFT is used for signal spectral analysis, the  sequence usually represents a finite set of uniformly spaced time-samples of some signal , where  represents time.  The conversion from continuous time to samples (discrete-time) changes the underlying Fourier transform of  into a discrete-time Fourier transform (DTFT), which generally entails a type of distortion called aliasing.  Choice of an appropriate sample-rate (see Nyquist rate) is the key to minimizing that distortion.  Similarly, the conversion from a very long (or infinite) sequence to a manageable size entails a type of distortion called leakage, which is manifested as a loss of detail (a.k.a. resolution) in the DTFT.  Choice of an appropriate sub-sequence length is the primary key to minimizing that effect.  When the available data (and time to process it) is more than the amount needed to attain the desired frequency resolution, a standard technique is to perform multiple DFTs, for example to create a spectrogram.  If the desired result is a power spectrum and noise or randomness is present in the data, averaging the magnitude components of the multiple DFTs is a useful procedure to reduce the variance of the spectrum (also called a periodogram in this context); two examples of such techniques are the Welch method and the Bartlett method; the general subject of estimating the power spectrum of a noisy signal is called spectral estimation.

A final source of distortion (or perhaps illusion) is the DFT itself, because it is just a discrete sampling of the DTFT, which is a function of a continuous frequency domain. That can be mitigated by increasing the resolution of the DFT.
The procedure is sometimes referred to as zero-padding, which is a particular implementation used in conjunction with the fast Fourier transform (FFT) algorithm.  The inefficiency of performing multiplications and additions with zero-valued "samples" is more than offset by the inherent efficiency of the FFT.
As already stated, leakage imposes a limit on the inherent resolution of the DTFT, so there is a practical limit to the benefit that can be obtained from a fine-grained DFT.

Optics, diffraction, and tomography 

The discrete Fourier transform is widely used with spatial frequencies in modeling the way that light, electrons, and other probes travel through optical systems and scatter from objects in two and three dimensions. The dual (direct/reciprocal) vector space of three dimensional objects further makes available a three dimensional reciprocal lattice, whose construction from translucent object shadows (via the Fourier slice theorem) allows tomographic reconstruction of three dimensional objects with a wide range of applications e.g. in modern medicine.

Filter bank 

Data compression
The field of digital signal processing relies heavily on operations in the frequency domain (i.e. on the Fourier transform). For example, several lossy image and sound compression methods employ the discrete Fourier transform: the signal is cut into short segments, each is transformed, and then the Fourier coefficients of high frequencies, which are assumed to be unnoticeable, are discarded. The decompressor computes the inverse transform based on this reduced number of Fourier coefficients. (Compression applications often use a specialized form of the DFT, the discrete cosine transform or sometimes the modified discrete cosine transform.)
Some relatively recent compression algorithms, however, use wavelet transforms, which give a more uniform compromise between time and frequency domain than obtained by chopping data into segments and transforming each segment.  In the case of JPEG2000, this avoids the spurious image features that appear when images are highly compressed with the original JPEG.

Partial differential equations
Discrete Fourier transforms are often used to solve partial differential equations, where again the DFT is used as an approximation for the Fourier series (which is recovered in the limit of infinite N). The advantage of this approach is that it expands the signal in complex exponentials , which are eigenfunctions of differentiation: . A linear differential equation with constant coefficients is transformed into an easily solvable algebraic equation. One then uses the inverse DFT to transform the result back into the ordinary spatial representation. Such an approach is called a spectral method.

Polynomial multiplication

Suppose we wish to compute the polynomial product c(x) = a(x) · b(x).  The ordinary product expression for the coefficients of c involves a linear (acyclic) convolution, where indices do not "wrap around."  This can be rewritten as a cyclic convolution by taking the coefficient vectors for a(x) and b(x) with constant term first, then appending zeros so that the resultant coefficient vectors a and b have dimension .  Then,

Where c is the vector of coefficients for c(x), and the convolution operator  is defined so

But convolution becomes multiplication under the DFT:

Here the vector product is taken elementwise.  Thus the coefficients of the product polynomial c(x) are just the terms 0, ..., deg(a(x)) + deg(b(x)) of the coefficient vector

With a fast Fourier transform, the resulting algorithm takes O(N log N) arithmetic operations.  Due to its simplicity and speed, the Cooley–Tukey FFT algorithm, which is limited to composite sizes, is often chosen for the transform operation.  In this case, d should be chosen as the smallest integer greater than the sum of the input polynomial degrees that is factorizable into small prime factors (e.g. 2, 3, and 5, depending upon the FFT implementation).

Multiplication of large integers

The fastest known algorithms for the multiplication of very large integers use the polynomial multiplication method outlined above.  Integers can be treated as the value of a polynomial evaluated specifically at the number base, with the coefficients of the polynomial corresponding to the digits in that base (ex. ).  After polynomial multiplication, a relatively low-complexity carry-propagation step completes the multiplication.

Convolution  
When data is convolved with a function with wide support, such as for downsampling by a large sampling ratio, because of the Convolution theorem and the FFT algorithm, it may be faster to transform it, multiply pointwise by the transform of the filter and then reverse transform it.  Alternatively, a good filter is obtained by simply truncating the transformed data and re-transforming the shortened data set.

Some discrete Fourier transform pairs

Generalizations

Representation theory 

The DFT can be interpreted as a complex-valued representation of the finite cyclic group. In other words, a sequence of  complex numbers can be thought of as an element of -dimensional complex space  or equivalently a function  from the finite cyclic group of order  to the complex numbers, . So   is a class function on the finite cyclic group, and thus can be expressed as a linear combination of the irreducible characters of this group, which are the roots of unity.

From this point of view, one may generalize the DFT to representation theory generally, or more narrowly to the representation theory of finite groups.

More narrowly still, one may generalize the DFT by either changing the target (taking values in a field other than the complex numbers), or the domain (a group other than a finite cyclic group), as detailed in the sequel.

Other fields 

Such properties include the completeness, orthogonality, Plancherel/Parseval, periodicity, shift, convolution, and unitarity properties above, as well as many FFT algorithms. For this reason, the discrete Fourier transform can be defined by using roots of unity in fields other than the complex numbers, and such generalizations are commonly called number-theoretic transforms (NTTs) in the case of finite fields. For more information, see number-theoretic transform and discrete Fourier transform (general).

Other finite groups 

The standard DFT acts on a sequence x0, x1, ..., xN−1 of complex numbers, which can be viewed as a function {0, 1, ..., N − 1} → C. The multidimensional DFT acts on multidimensional sequences, which can be viewed as functions

This suggests the generalization to Fourier transforms on arbitrary finite groups, which act on functions G → C where G is a finite group. In this framework, the standard DFT is seen as the Fourier transform on a cyclic group, while the multidimensional DFT is a Fourier transform on a direct sum of cyclic groups.

Further, Fourier transform can be on cosets of a group.

Alternatives

 There are various alternatives to the DFT for various applications, prominent among which are wavelets. The analog of the DFT is the discrete wavelet transform (DWT). From the point of view of time–frequency analysis, a key limitation of the Fourier transform is that it does not include location information, only frequency information, and thus has difficulty in representing transients. As wavelets have location as well as frequency, they are better able to represent location, at the expense of greater difficulty representing frequency. For details, see comparison of the discrete wavelet transform with the discrete Fourier transform.

See also
Companion matrix
DFT matrix
Fast Fourier transform
FFTPACK
FFTW
Generalizations of Pauli matrices
Least-squares spectral analysis
List of Fourier-related transforms
Multidimensional transform
Zak transform
Quantum Fourier transform

Notes

References

Further reading
 
 
  esp. section 30.2: The DFT and FFT, pp. 830–838.
 
 
  (Note that this paper has an apparent typo in its table of the eigenvalue multiplicities: the +i/−i columns are interchanged.  The correct table can be found in McClellan and Parks, 1972, and is easily confirmed numerically.)

External links
Interactive explanation of the DFT
Matlab tutorial on the Discrete Fourier Transformation 
Interactive flash tutorial on the DFT
Mathematics of the Discrete Fourier Transform by Julius O. Smith III
FFTW: Fast implementation of the DFT - coded in C and under General Public License (GPL)
General Purpose FFT Package:  Yet another fast DFT implementation in C & FORTRAN, permissive license
Explained: The Discrete Fourier Transform
Discrete Fourier Transform
Indexing and shifting of Discrete Fourier Transform
Discrete Fourier Transform Properties
Generalized Discrete Fourier Transform (GDFT) with Nonlinear Phase

Fourier analysis
Digital signal processing
Numerical analysis
Discrete transforms
Unitary operators

cs:Fourierova transformace#Diskrétní Fourierova transformace
pt:Transformada de Fourier#Transformada discreta de Fourier
fi:Fourier'n muunnos#Diskreetti Fourier'n muunnos